James Allin Yacabonis (born March 21, 1992) is an American professional baseball pitcher in the New York Mets organization. He has played in Major League Baseball (MLB) for the Baltimore Orioles, Seattle Mariners, Miami Marlins and Tampa Bay Rays.

Early life and education
Yacabonis is the son of Maria and James Yacabonis. His grandfather played professional baseball in Cuba. He attended Christian Brothers Academy in Lincroft, New Jersey. He attended Saint Joseph's University, where he played college baseball on the Saint Joseph's Hawks baseball team.

Career

Baltimore Orioles
The Baltimore Orioles selected Yacabonis in the 13th round of the 2013 Major League Baseball draft as the 399th pick overall. He signed and spent 2013 with the Aberdeen IronBirds where he was 3–1 with a 1.52 ERA in 29.2 relief innings pitched. In 2014, he pitched for the Delmarva Shorebirds and Frederick Keys where he compiled a 1–5 record and 5.03 ERA in 38 games pitched out of the bullpen, and in 2015, he returned to Frederick where he posted a 3–3 record, 4.02 ERA, and 1.71 WHIP in 43 games pitched. Yacabonis spent 2016 with both Frederick and the Bowie Baysox where he was 2–4 with a 2.64 ERA in 50 relief appearances, holding hitters to a .216 batting average against. He was promoted to the Norfolk Tides to begin 2017.

2017
Yacabonis was called up to the majors for the first time on June 11, 2017. As he had difficulty finding the strike zone in his first three June 2017 appearances with the Orioles, he was sent back to Norfolk — where as closer he turned in a 0.93 ERA and 0.99 WHIP. He was recalled from Norfolk on July 2, 2017, likely to work in middle relief during his second call-up for the Orioles. He attributes his success in 2017 to his command of a certain pitch. As he says:

In his first up after being called back from Norfolk, Yacabonis shut down the Milwaukee Brewers on July 3, 2017 for 3.1 innings. He allowed just one run on three hits, striking out two batters. Of his contribution in the game after being sent back down, Showalter said, ". . Yac was the key. . . we sent him down to get stretched out a little bit and work on some things, shorten up the breaking ball a little bit, and he presented himself well."
Yacabonis knocked in the only Orioles' run in the 8–1 loss by grounding out to second base, which scored Rubén Tejada from third in the third inning. He was optioned to Triple-A Norfolk the next day. Yacabonis was recalled September 1, 2017, coming in that day in a scoreless game against the Toronto Blue Jays in the top of 13th inning. He shut down the side to get his first major league win.

2018
After a strong spring training for Yacabonis, where he posted a 3.38 ERA over eight innings, the Orioles optioned him to Triple-A Norfolk March 22, 2018 with the possible intent of developing him into a starting pitcher. Yacabonis had refined his mechanics to take stress off his throwing shoulder. Yacabonis was called up from Triple-A Norfolk to cover the Orioles bullpen April 7, 2018, after the previous night's 14-inning game with the Yankees required nine innings of relief pitching. He was sent back down to Triple-A Norfolk on April 8, 2018, with left-handed pitcher Tanner Scott being called up from there. Yacabonis gave up three earned runs in one inning against the Yankees.

Yacabonis was called up from Triple-A Norfolk prior to a May 11 game against Tampa Bay to provide another bullpen arm for the four-game series. After being sent down again to work on his command, he was recalled on June 27 and made his first Major League Baseball career start a day later against the Seattle Mariners. Through seven interim starts with disruption in Norfolk, Yacabonis had posted a 1.99 ERA with a 0.884 WHIP. He had a 3.14 ERA overall in Triple-A through that point in the season. He was called up by the Orioles later in the season. He finished the season with a 0–2 record in seven starts (12 games).

2019
In 2019 for the Orioles, Yacabonis pitched to a 1–2 record and a 6.80 ERA over 29 games. Yacabonis was designated for assignment by the Orioles on August 14, 2019. He became a free agent following the 2019 season.

San Diego Padres
On December 19, 2019, Yacabonis signed a minor league deal with the San Diego Padres. Yacabonis did not play in a game for the Padres in 2020 due to the cancellation of the minor league season because of the COVID-19 pandemic.

Seattle Mariners
On August 19, 2020, Yacabonis was traded to the Seattle Mariners in exchange for cash considerations. On September 9, Yacabonis was selected to the active roster. Yacabonis was designated for assignment by the Mariners on September 15. He elected free agency on October 14, 2020. On December 29, 2020, Yacabonis re-signed with the Mariners organization on a minor league contract. After appearing in 24 games for the Triple-A Tacoma Rainers, posting a 1.72 ERA with 29 strikeouts, Yacabonis had his contract selected on August 28, 2021 by the Mariners. On August 30, Yacabonis was designated for assignment by the Mariners without making an appearance. On September 2, Yacabonis cleared waivers and was assigned outright to Triple-A Tacoma. On October 13, Yacabonis elected free agency.

Miami Marlins
On March 12, 2022, Yacabonis signed a minor league contract with the Miami Marlins. On June 15, the Marlins selected Yacabonis' contract. He was designated for assignment on July 30, 2022.

Tampa Bay Rays
On August 4, 2022, the Tampa Bay Rays claimed Yacabonis off waivers from the Marlins. On August 18, Yacabonis was designated for assignment. He elected free agency on November 10, 2022.

New York Mets
On December 1, 2022, Yacabonis signed a minor league deal with the New York Mets.

References

External links

1992 births
Living people
Aberdeen IronBirds players
Baltimore Orioles players
Baseball players from New Jersey
Bowie Baysox players
Christian Brothers Academy (New Jersey) alumni
Delmarva Shorebirds players
Frederick Keys players
Major League Baseball pitchers
Miami Marlins players
Norfolk Tides players
Peoria Javelinas players
Saint Joseph's Hawks baseball players
Seattle Mariners players
Sportspeople from Elizabeth, New Jersey
Tacoma Rainiers players
Tampa Bay Rays players